Sidney Arnold Barron (June 13, 1917 in Toronto – April 29, 2006 in Victoria, British Columbia) was a  Canadian editorial cartoonist and artist. During his career as a cartoonist, he drew for the Victoria Times, the Toronto Star, Maclean's, and The Albertan. His cartoons were satirical takes on social mores, and often contained a biplane towing a banner, and a bored-looking cat, holding a card bearing a wry comment. Later in life, Barron moved to Vancouver Island, where he and his wife opened an art studio and gallery.

Early life
During the First World War, Sid Barron's mother, Daisy Hilda Wormald, moved from England to her married sister Florence's household in Toronto after becoming pregnant to a Belgian soldier billeted with her parents. Daisy's child Sidney was born in Toronto on June 13, 1917. Florence and her husband adopted the baby and moved to Victoria when Sidney was 2. (Barron grew up believing Florence was his mother and Daisy was his aunt, and would not discover the truth until he was an adult).  He attended South Park Elementary School and Victoria High School and grew up around the shipping port at Victoria’s breakwater, where he developed a passion for sketching boats. He had a pronounced stammer as a child, and was treated for it at age 21 at the National Hospital for Speech Disorders in New York.

Comic book artist

After graduating from high school, Barron found work as a sign painter and commercial illustrator during the Great Depression, producing, among other things, schedule cards for Union Steamships. At age 21, he took his first formal art classes from young art prodigy Allan Edwards (along with Pierre Berton), and did some illustrations for Toronto's Star Weekly. During the Second World War, Barron worked in the Canadian comic book industry, producing comics for Canadian Heroes Comics, published by Educational Comics. He started to paint harbours, ships and beach scenes in watercolour and tempera (but not oil paints because he was allergic to them). He also did some war illustrations for the Toronto Star.

Following the war, Barron received some art training in Detroit. He was used by the Star Weekly as a freelance illustrator until the magazine began purchasing illustrations from American syndicates as a cost-saving measure. He then spent the rest of the 1950s seeking work in B.C. and Ontario.

Editorial cartoonist
In 1958 Stu Keate, publisher of the Victoria Daily Times, asked Barron to produce editorial cartoons. In 1961, Pierre Berton introduced Barron to the editor of the Toronto Star, and Barron moved to Toronto to begin a 30-year relationship with the Star, starting as an alternate to cartoonist Duncan Macpherson. In 1962, he moved to Calgary to produce work for The Albertan while still selling pieces to the Star. In 1964, he started selling cartoons to MacLean's.

His black-and-white cartoons were densely filled with small details, and commented satirically on the absurdity of modern and suburban life. Critic Robert Fulford called him "the poet of the mundane." Journalist Brenda Gough characterized his work as "relatively mild yet satirically insightful topical cartoons of social mores and suburbia [that] utilized a clear line and elegant, unexaggerated figures placed in extremely cluttered backgrounds full of sight gags and signs." 

Two distinctive "trademarks" that often appeared in his works were a bored-looking "puddy-tat" holding a sign with a sardonic comment, and sometimes a biplane with a trailing banner.

Artist
Barron had been married twice before when he met fellow artist Jesi at an art therapy class in 1975, and married her in 1977. After the National Archives of Canada and the Glenbow Museum bought many of his original cartoons, he was able to retire as a cartoonist, and he and Jesi travelled for several years. In 1989, they moved to Coombs, British Columbia on Vancouver Island, where they opened an art gallery to sell their work. During this period, Barron created watercolours of beach scenes and nautical themes. 

In 1997, the Barrons moved to Victoria. Ten years later, Sid Barron died at Mount St. Mary Hospital, on April 29, 2006, age 88.

Legacy
Collections of Barron's work can be found at the Art Gallery of Greater Victoria, the Glenbow Museum, the National Archives of Canada, the Okanagan Heritage Museum and in private collections in Canada and the USA.

Education
1945 Meitzinger Institute, Detroit Michigan, USA
1941 Vancouver School of Art, Vancouver, BC
1940 Private Lessons with Alan Edwards, Victoria

Exhibitions

Solo
2010 Ship Shapes, Polychrome Fine Arts, Victoria BC, Canada
1976 Sid Barron, Open Space, Victoria
1973 Sid Barron, Paintings and Collages, Art Gallery of Greater Victoria
1965 Mr.Sid Barron, Canadian Art Galleries, Calgary
1949 Sid Barron, Vancouver Art Gallery, Vancouver

Duo
1992 A Lifetime of Explorations, Sid & Jesi, Nanaimo Art Gallery, Nanaimo
1991 Sid & Jesi Barron, The Old School House Gallery, Qualicum
1983 Sid & Jesi Barron, The Little Gallery, Victoria
1981 The Art Gallery At The Crystal (Sid & Jesi Barron), Crystal Gardens, Victoria
1979 Sid & Jesi Barron, The Little Gallery, Victoria
1978 Barron & Jesi, Watercolours & Drawings, The Little Gallery, Victoria
1977 Sid & Jesi Barron, Santa Cruz, California, USA
1977 Sid & Jesi Barron, Majorca, Spain

Group
2011 Hobnob 3, Polychrome Fine Arts, Victoria BC, Canada
2010 Wish List, Polychrome Fine Arts, Victoria BC, Canada
2010 Hobnob 2, Polychrome Fine Arts, Victoria BC, Canada
1995 La Fleur Invitational Exhibition, The Old School House, Qualicum
1995 The Circle Show, Barron’s Country Gallery, Coombs
1995 Studio Show, Barron’s Country Gallery, Coombs
1994 Studio Show, Barron’s Art Centre, Coombs
1994 Arts & Crafts Jury Show, District 69 Community Arts Council, Qualicum
1993 Studio Show, Barron’s Art Centre, Coombs
1992 Expose Yourself, Eagleshore Gallery, Qualicum
1992 Ten Faces, District 69 Community Arts Council, Parksville
1992 Studio Show, Barron’s Art Centre, Coombs
1992 6th Annual Garden Party & Art Auction, The Old School House, Qualicum
1991 Studio Show, Barron’s Art Centre, Coombs
1990 Studio Show, Barron’s Art Centre, Coombs
1989 A View Of The World From Ontario, John B. Aird Gallery, Toronto
1988 Studio Show, Barron’s Art Centre, Coombs
1987 Studio Show, Barron’s Art Centre, Coombs
1981 Penticton International Auction of Fine Art, Penticton Arts Council, Penticton
1979 Spring Show ’79, The Little Gallery, Victoria
1978 Leafhill Galleries, Victoria
1973 The Little Gallery, Victoria
1967 Cartoon Sale, Alberton, Calgary
1958 B.C. Paintings-Burnaby 58, Burnaby
1958 18th Quarterly Group Exhibition, Vancouver Art Gallery, Vancouver
1957 17th Quarterly Group Exhibition, Vancouver Art Gallery, Vancouver

Publications
1989 Portfoolio ‘89 Canadian Caricature, Macmillan, Toronto
1988 Portfoolio ‘88 Canadian Caricature, Eden Press, Montreal
1987 Portfoolio ‘87 Canadian Caricature, Guy Badeaux, Croc Publishing, Ludcom Inc. Montreal
1986 Portfoolio ‘86 Canadian Caricature, Guy Badeaux, Croc Publishing, Ludcom Inc. Montreal
1985 The Best of Barron, Lester & Orpen Dennys Ltd, Toronto
1981 Penticton International Auction of Fine Art, Penticton Arts Council, Penticton
1972 The Barron Book (With Puddytat Centerfold), Star Reader Service, Toronto
1968 A Scar Is Born by Eric Nicol, Illustrated by Barron, The Ryerson Press, Toronto
1967 Barron’s Calgary Cartoons Vol.1, The Alberton, Calgary
1960 2nd Annual Barron’s Victoria, Victoria Times, Victoria
1959 Barron’s Victoria: cartoons selected from the Victoria Times, Victoria
1965 “Barron's Toronto” Star Reader Service, Toronto
1958 B.C. Paintings: Burnaby 58 / [Alvin L. Balkind], Burnaby Centennial Committee
1944  “A Christmas Carol” for colouring, Educational Products Inc.

Reviews
2010 June 19, “Barron Much More Than A Cartoonist,”, Robert Amos, Times Colonist
2006 May 15, “Sid Barron, Cartoonist 1917-2006”, Tom Hawthorn, The Globe and Mail
1998 Sat. Sept. 25, “Photos overlaid with paint may be ...”, Robert Amos,Times Colonist
1998 Tues. Mar. 24, “A Tale Of Two Well Known BC Artists”, Parksville Qualicum Beach News
1995 Fri.April 28, “Cartoonist Finds Joy In Painting”, Parksville Qualicum Beach News
1995  “Circle Show In For Good Cause”, Nancy Whelan, Parksville Qualicum Beach News
1994 Tues. May 24, “Coombs Gallery Home To Ten Artists”, Parksville Qualicum Beach News
1993 Aug. “Cartoonist Would Rather Be Great Painter”, Corinne Jackson, Island Senior
1993 May 2, “Coombs Couple Quietly Waiting to be Discovered”, Sandra McCulloch, Horizons
1992 Thur. Aug. 27, “Artists Capture Friends On Canvas”, Jane Lyons, P-Q Magazine
1992 Mon. May 11, Exhibition To Open At College Art Gallery, The Bulletin
1992 Tues. June 16, B2, “Arts Council Opens Ten Faces”, Parksville-Qualicum Beach News
1991 Tues. April 2, A29, “Local Artists Featured In Festival”, Parksville-Qualicum Beach News
1991 Sat. April 6, “Barrons Are Pros In A Neighbourhood of ...”, Robert Amos, Times Colonist
1990 June 15, “Barrons Bloom Anew”, Charles Hart, The Arrowsmith Star
1990  (exhibition review) Robert Amos, Times Colonist
1989 Jan. 25, “Sun Cartoonists Put On Show Over ‘ome”, pg.17, Financial Post
1989 August 12, “Way To Go, Sooke...”,Robert Amos, Times Colonist
1987 August 9, “Drawing Toronto from the Coast”, R.S. Diotte, Islander
1987 February 21, “Creative Output Of The Remarkable Barron”, R. Amos, Times Colonist
1985  “He Draws Anyplace”, Dan Smith, Toronto Star, Toronto
1985 October 17, “The Barron of Toronto”, Richard Van Dine, pg.9, Monday Magazine
1981 November 6, Exhibition Review, pg.9 Times Colonist
1979 Around The Galleries (exhibition review), Times Colonist
1979 Jan.11, “Cartoonist Gather To Hear Bierman Case...”, pg.43, Daily Colonist
1979 December 7, “The Call of the Loon”, Monday Magazine
1977  “Suburban Sid Finds Spain Palette-able”, Jim Gibson, Colonist
1977 February 19, Edmonton Journal, Edmonton
1977 Interview, Monday Magazine
1976 September 23, “Barron Painting on Show”, Victoria Times
1973  “Arrival of An Artist-And Other Thoughts”, Jack Scott, Victoria Times
1973 Feb.7, “Will The Real Etaoin Shrdlu Please Stand Up”, pg.19, The Victorian
1972 October, “Barronland” Introduction by Robert Fulford
1967  “Barron’s Fan Mail All Sizes”, Shapes, Bob Blansjaar, The Albertan, Calgary
1967 Dec. “Always with Kindness”, Tom Primrose pg.10, ?
1957 Dec.10, 17th Quarterly Group Exhibition, v.25 no.4, VAG Bulletin, Vancouver
1949 June 25, “In the Realm Of Art”, Palette, Vancouver Province
1949 June 21, “Watercolour Display, Breezy, Vivacious”, M. Valley Thornton, Vancouver Sun

Affiliations
1958-89 Syndicated Editorial Cartoonist
1979 Federation of Canadian Artists

Professional Activities
1987-97 Co-owner of Barron’s Gallery, Coombs, BC
1961-89 Editorial Cartoonist for the Toronto Star
1961-66 Editorial Cartoonist for Maclean’s Magazine
1962 Editorial Cartoonist for The Albertan
1958-61 Editorial Cartoonist for the Victoria Times (Times Colonist)
1941-58 Commercial Artist, Neon Sign Designer, Illustrator for Educational Products Inc. Comics' Canadian Heroes, Union Steamships (Vancouver), and Billboard Painter (Toronto)

References

External links
 Biography and examples of Barron's work at the Association of Canadian Editorial Cartoonists

Canadian cartoonists
1917 births
2006 deaths
Canadian editorial cartoonists